Luigi Pasqualigo (1536–1576) was a Venetian soldier and man of letters who wrote the play Il Fedele that was adapted by the English playwright Anthony Munday under the title, Fidele and Fortunio (1584). According to his brother, he was "more a follower of Mars than of Apollo". Pasqualigo apparently took part in the Battle of Lepanto of 1571. He is named as commander of the Spanish galleon Idra (Hydra) of Naples which was stationed on the left wing of the battle.

Publications 
 Dalle Lettere Amorose, Libri Quattro, Vinegia, 1573, 1581 and 1607.
 Il Fedele, Venezia, Bolognino Zaltieri, 1576.
 Il Fedele, Comedia…Di Novo Ristampata, e ricorretta, Venetia, appresso Francesco Zinetti, 1579.
 Il Fedele, a cura di Francesca Romana de’Angelis, Roma, E & A editori associati, 1989.
 Gl'Intricati, (pastoral romance), 1581. 
 Rime Volgari, Venetia, appresso Gio.Battista Ciotti, 1605.

Influences 
Plays influenced by Pasqualigo's play, Il Fedele, include:
 Pierre de Larivey, Le Fidelle, a French version of Luigi Pasqualigo's Il Fedele. 
 Anthony Munday, Fidele and Fortunio.
 Abraham Fraunce, Victoria: A Latin Comedy

References 

Italian dramatists and playwrights
Republic of Venice military personnel